L'Abécédaire de Gilles Deleuze (“Gilles Deleuze's alphabet book”) is a French television program produced by Pierre-André Boutang in 1988–1989, consisting of an eight-hour series of interviews between Gilles Deleuze and Claire Parnet.

Themes

 A for Animal (English: Animal)
 B for Boisson (English: Drink)
 C for Culture (English: Culture)
 D for Désir (English: Desire)
 E for Enfance (English: Childhood)
 F for Fidélité (English: Loyalty)
 G for Gauche (English: Left-wing politics)
 H for Histoire de la Philosophie (English: History of philosophy)
 I for Idée (English: Idea)
 J for Joie (English: Joy)
 K for Kant (English: Immanuel Kant)
 L for Littérature (English: Literature)
 M for Maladie (English: Disease)
 N for Neurologie (English: Neurology)
 O for Opéra (English: Opera)
 P for Professeur (English: Professor)
 Q for Question (English: Question)
 R for Résistance (English: Resistance movement)
 S for Style (English: Style)
 T for Tennis (English: Tennis)
 U for Un (English: One)
 V for Voyage (English: Travel)
 W for Wittgenstein (English: Ludwig Wittgenstein)
 X  and Y for Inconnues (English: Variables)
 Z for Zig-zag

External links
 IMDb
 Charles J. Stivale, Summary of "Gilles Deleuze's ABC Primer"

Gilles Deleuze
French documentary television series
1996 French television series debuts
1990s French television series